is the seventh solo album by Susumu Hirasawa.

Overview
With his previous solo album Siren, Susumu Hirasawa felt that he perfected both the "simulated world music" concept that started on Sim City and his post-Aurora vocal style. He essentially stopped experimenting with his style in the late '90s because he felt that no new developments on that front would arise. Instead, he shifted his focus towards creating music for Interactive Live Shows.

Technique of Relief was, from the beginning, a concept album for an interactive live. It builds upon a broad "restoration of a perfect character" theme introduced in Scuba: while that album was about bringing scattered individuals back together into a group, Technique of Relief has the thoughts and experiences of many people combining into a neural network and becoming a single entity. The concept of "Green Nerve", which Hirasawa had played with in previous works, appears here as the character of a perfected human. The plot begins as the World Cell's breakdown causes the Green Nerve Network to cease functioning, and the Bridge Builder (Hirasawa) has to repair it.

Hirasawa rerecorded songs originally performed by Berserk actress Yūko Miyamura ("Moon Time" and "Mother") for the album. All the album's tracks weren't conceptualized and recorded holistically, but rather continually modified based on various phrases and flourishes he thought of on the fly.

On Technique of Relief, Hirasawa incorporated new sounds that he came in contact with into its style: tracks from a cassette tape of Indian music that a friend of his bought in the country were extensively sampled, 8 bit 22.050 kHz techno/jungle MOD files downloaded from a German site were used as drum parts for four songs ("Town-0 Phase-5", "The Man from Narcissus Space", "Strange Night of the Omnificience", "World Cell") and he applied elements from luk thung after seeing its popularity across all layers of Thai society.

Technique of Relief is the last of Hirasawa's main discography to be recorded in Bangkok. Unlike previous occasions, he recorded electric guitar parts as well as vocal ones. Since he did not bring one of his trademark Talbo guitars to Thailand, he had to rent a Fender Stratocaster, whose sound he disliked. The album is also the first since Virtual Rabbit where Japanese guest musicians, both singers and instrumentalists, appear.

Track listing

Personnel
Susumu Hirasawa - Vocals, Electric guitar (Fender Stratocaster), Acoustic guitar (Fernandes), Synthesizers (E-mu Proteus/2, Korg M1R, Roland JD-800, Roland JD-990), Sampler (Akai S1100), Drum machine (Roland R-8 with DANCE card), Amiga (4000/040), Sequencer (Bars&Pipes Professional), Programming, Production

additional performers
Mari Furusato - Soprano Voice on "Moon Time"
Keiju Nakajima - Sumatra Magic Horn on "Mother"
uncredited  friend of Hirasawa's whom he nicknamed  - Soprano Solo on "The Man from Narcissus Space"

technical
Masanori Chinzei - Recording and Mixing
Nitt, Toshiyuki Nakamura - Assistant Engineering
Yuka Koizumi (Orange) - Mastering

visuals
Kiyoshi Inagaki (Tristero Design) - Art Direction & Design
Yosuke Komatsu (Odd Job Ltd.) - Photography
Kazunori Yoshida - Hair & Make-Up
Akemi Tsujitani - Styling

operations
Nippon Columbia
Teslakite
Eiichi Yamakawa - Production (Executive)
Toshiyuki Akimoto - Direction
Mika Hirano - Promotion
Shingo Ninomiya - Promotion
Naoya Shimizu - Sales Promotion
Chika Fujita - Edit
Chaos Union Soho Project - Artist Management
Wai Rachatachotic - Coordinator
Chaos Thai: Takahisa Taira, Sajja "Yai" Tanyacharoen

thanks
Danuphol "P. Jae" Kaewkan, Kentaro Miura, Akira Shimada (Young Animal), Toshio Nakatani (NTV), Satoshi Kon, Suguru Funatsu (Nippon Columbia), Tokinori Katakura & Yuka Furusato (Nippon Columbia), Yasumi Tanaka, NIFTY-Serve FAMIGA Interactive Live 要素技術支援 Project

Release history

References

Bibliography

 .

External links
 Interactive Live Show 1998 "WORLD CELL" Story Summary
 "TOWN-0 PHASE-5" music video

1998 albums
Susumu Hirasawa albums
Nippon Columbia albums